The Northeast Collegiate Hockey League is an ACHA Division I Hockey League consisting of seven teams in the Northeastern United States. A majority of members are located in New York with additional teams coming from New Jersey.

History
The league was announced on July 19, 2007 with plans to begin its first season later that year. The league's first seven members were Binghamton University, Ithaca College, Penn State Berks, Rutgers University, St. Bonaventure University, SUNY Cortland, and SUNY Oswego. Andy Gojdycz was named the NECHL's first commissioner.

Ahead of the 2010–11 season, Syracuse University joined the NECHL from the Eastern Collegiate Hockey League. By 2013, the Orange were joined by four more former ECHL schools; Niagara University, Rochester Institute of Technology, University at Buffalo, and Canisius College.

The College of New Jersey jumped from ACHA Division II and joined the NECHL for the 2022–23 season.

Format
Teams play a 15 game league schedule, playing each of the other five teams three times in the regular season. At the conclusion of the regular season the league holds a post season tournament hosted by one of the member schools. The tournament is held over three days at a single venue with top-seeded teams receiving first round byes. The Memorial Cup and an automatic bid to the ACHA Men's Division I National Championship Tournament is awarded to the winner of the tournament.

Membership

Note: Canisius and RIT also field NCAA Division I hockey teams, SUNY - Oswego also fields NCAA Division III.

Former Members
 Penn State Berks, moved to the CSCHC
 Ithaca College, moved to the UNYCHL
 Binghamton University, moved to the UNYCHL
 Syracuse University, moved to the ESCHL
 St. Bonaventure University, moved to the UNYCHL
 SUNY Cortland, moved to the UNYCHL
 Cornell University, moved to the UNYCHL
 Niagara University, moved to the ESCHL

Membership timeline

Conference Arenas

Championship results

ACHA National Tournament results

NECHL team tournament records
Teams that no longer participate in the Northeast Collegiate Hockey League are in italics.

Notes

References

External links
 NECHL site

See also
American Collegiate Hockey Association 
List of ice hockey leagues

ACHA Division 1 conferences
2007 establishments in the United States